Ibrahima Diallo (born 13 October 1959) is a Senegalese judoka. He competed in the men's lightweight event at the 1984 Summer Olympics.

References

1959 births
Living people
Senegalese male judoka
Olympic judoka of Senegal
Judoka at the 1984 Summer Olympics
Place of birth missing (living people)